Nick Freno: Licensed Teacher (also known as Nick Freno) is an American sitcom television series starring comedian Mitch Mullany that aired on The WB from August 28, 1996, to May 3, 1998.

The series was created and executive produced by Dennis Rinsler and Marc Warren who drew on their own experiences as former teachers in New York City. They based the title character on their elementary school music teacher and friend, John Freno.

Synopsis
Mitch Mullany starred as the title character, an aspiring actor who, while waiting for his "big break," met his expenses as a substitute teacher at Gerald R. Ford Middle School. The storylines involved his interaction with his students, which became more plausible when he became a regular teacher. For the series' second season, the middle school had become a high school, allowing for his interaction with slightly more mature students.

First season
Originally, Freno substituted long-term for a single fifth-grade class, which suited him well as an actor, since he was often able to revisit the mind of a preteen through comedy routines and frenetic behavior he would often work into during lessons. Nick's free-form teaching style often relied on running mock game shows on subjects, along with sly reverse psychology when it came to advice and discipline. The kids embraced Freno and found him very approachable, even if his employers thought that his methods were not challenging enough to be taken seriously.

Nick's fellow faculty members included hip, black science teacher Mezz Crosby (Reggie Hayes in the pilot episode, Clinton Jackson thereafter), who had been Nick's best friend since childhood; tenured shop teacher Al Yaroker (Charles Cyphers), and blustery gym coach Kurt Fust (Stuart Pankin). Also wandering the halls was old-timer Phil (Sid Newman), the school security guard. Then there was sexy, young social studies teacher Elana Lewis (Portia de Rossi), whom Nick was interested in romantically; at first, it was strictly professional and nothing more between the two, but through the first season, figurative walls were gradually broken down, and Nick and Elana found themselves dating. Their relationship would be on-again, off-again for the rest of that year. At first, Ford Middle School's principal was referred to but not seen; midway through the first season, Mr. Fust was eventually promoted to assistant principal. The regularly featured pupils in Nick's class were class clown and chief operator Tyler Hale (Ross Malinger), shy, star student Orlando Diaz (Jonathan Hernandez), who was practically the antithesis of Tyler; Jared (Arjay Smith), Tyler's buddy and regular partner in crime; intellectual Sarah (Cara DeLizia); and saxophonist Davey Marcucci (Kyle Gibson).

Second season
In the second season, with Nick now teaching on the high school level, more adult humor made its way into the stories and there were many changes in the cast, not only with the featured students but in the faculty as well. Off-screen, between the first and second seasons, Nick and Elana dissolved their romance, and the latter left her job and moved out of town. Besides Nick, the only returning characters were Mezz, Mr. Yaroker, and Phil the security guard (who had now made it to the opening credits). Mr. Fust disappeared, as did the now-former unseen principal; arriving as the new headmaster was Dr. Katherine Emerson (Jane Sibbett), a more serious-minded administrator who became a nemesis for Nick. Despite the friction that occurred between the two, Nick developed a romantic interest in Emerson.

Nick's job as a full-time teacher stuck him with instructing remedial classes, a situation heavily inspired by Welcome Back, Kotter. Nick's unruly high-schoolers included Sophia Del Bono (Christina Vidal), sexually promiscuous and not as worldly as she liked to let on; socially awkward Miles Novacek (Giuseppe Andrews); Marco Romero (Andrew Levitas), the hunk who had been held back a couple of grades; Tasha Morrison (Malinda Williams), whose upper-middle-class standing made her feel insecure around her blue-collar classmates; and Jordan Wells (Blake Heron), a similar personality to Nick's former fifth-grade troublemaker Tyler Hale.

Series changes
By the spring of 1998, when Nick's numerous attempts to court Dr. Emerson had failed, his attention switched to that of a beautiful and voluptuous new manager in his apartment building, Samantha (Donna D'Errico). The two consummated their sexual tension quickly and became an item. The addition of D'Errico to Nick Freno was seen as a last-ditch attempt to save the show from cancellation, but it was not picked up for a third season.

Cast

Tutorial staff
 Mitch Mullany as Nick Freno
 Portia De Rossi as Elana Lewis (1996–1997)
 Clinton Jackson as Mezz Crosby
 Reggie Hayes as Mezz Crosby (pilot episode only)
 Charles Cyphers as Al Yaroker
 Stuart Pankin as Kurt Fust (1996–1997)
 Jane Sibbett as Dr. Katherine Emerson (1997–1998)

Students
 Kyle Gibson as Davey Marcucci (1996–1997)
 Cara DeLizia as Sarah (1996–1997)
 Giuseppe Andrews as Miles Novacek (1997–1998)
 Jonathan Hernandez as Orlando Diaz (1996–1997)
 Blake Heron as Jordan Wells (1997–1998)
 Andrew Levitas as Marco Romero (1997–1998)
 Ross Malinger as Tyler Hale (1996–1997)
 Christina Vidal as Sophia Del Bono (1997–1998)
 Malinda Williams as Tasha Morrison (1997–1998)

Recurring
 Mila Kunis as Anna-Maria Del Bono
 Sid Newman as Phil Sussman

Episodes

Season 1 (1996–97)

Season 2 (1997–98)

Ratings

Awards and nominations

References

External links
 
 

1990s American high school television series
1990s American sitcoms
1990s American workplace comedy television series
1996 American television series debuts
1998 American television series endings
English-language television shows
Middle school television series
Television series about educators
Television series by Warner Bros. Television Studios
Television shows set in New York City
The WB original programming